"If I Love U 2nite" is a 1991 single by British singer Mica Paris.

Track listing
CD single

7″ Vinyl

12″ Vinyl

Charts

Mayte version

"If I Love U 2nite" (also known as "If Eye Love U 2night") is Mayte's solo debut, and the first single from her album, Child of the Sun. Mayte's narration of her love story, in which she and her lover's first date was "in bed", and she asks him if he'll love her forever. The song was suggested to be about Prince, whom she was dating at the time. The two would later wed on Valentine's Day, 1996.

History
The song was originally written by Prince for his band member Gayle Chapman to sing. Chapman recorded two versions of this song. Later, Prince sang it as an outtake in 1987 from a man's point of view. It was also covered by Mica Paris in 1991. The original Prince guide vocal for "If I Love U 2 Nite" appeared by mistake on the rare Mica Paris Stand for Love EP, of which only a handful exist. It was Mayte's biggest hit and a fan favorite due to Mayte's shy, cute, pop sound, unlike the others' soul sound. Chapman and Prince both performed this as a ballad.

Album cover

Riley Saline – Photographer
Ken O'Rourke – Hair Stylist

Track listing
CD #1 NPG Records / 0061635NPG (Europe)
"If Eye Love U 2night" (Radio Edit) (3:30)
"If Eye Love U 2night" (Album Version) (4:19)
"If Eye Love U 2night" (Spanish) (4:20)
"The Rhythm Of Your Heart" (3:17)

CD No. 2 (The Remixes) NPG Records / 0061925NPG (Europe)
"If Eye Love U 2night" (Album Version) (4:19)
"If Eye Love U 2night" (Lil' Cash Mix) (5:02)
"If Eye Love U 2night" (Displacement Mix) (6:05)
"If Eye Love U 2night" (Tweakin' Dub) (7:13)

Cassette NPG Records / 0061639NPG (Europe)
"If Eye Love U 2night" (Radio Edit) (3:30)
"The Rhythm Of Your Heart" (3:17)

References

1991 debut singles
1994 singles
Songs written by Prince (musician)
Paisley Park Records singles
1987 songs
Song recordings produced by Prince (musician)
Mica Paris songs